These hits topped the Dutch Top 40 in 1964.

See also
1964 in music

References

1964 in the Netherlands
1964 record charts
1964